Mario Aburto Martínez (born 3 October 1970) is a Mexican man who was convicted for assassinating presidential candidate Luis Donaldo Colosio in 1994. He confessed to the murder and was sentenced to 42 years in prison. Despite the confession and conviction, the New York Times reported that there was widespread belief within Mexico that the conviction involved a conspiracy and coverup mainly by Carlos Salinas de Gortari (the president at that time) and Manuel Camacho Solís (a member of Salinas' cabinet). A later Mexican film called Colosio, el asesinato alleged that the Salinas government was behind the crime.

References

1971 births
Living people
Mexican assassins
Mexican people convicted of murder
People convicted of murder by Mexico
People from Zamora, Michoacán
1994 murders in Mexico